Earnest is a ghost town in Farmington Township, Rooks County, Kansas, United States.

History
Earnest was issued a post office in 1882. The post office was discontinued in 1889.  There is nothing left of Earnest.

References

Former populated places in Rooks County, Kansas
Former populated places in Kansas
1882 establishments in Kansas
Populated places established in 1882